Cecilia Norrbom (born 28 January 1988) is a Swedish athlete. She competed in the women's marathon event at the 2019 World Athletics Championships.

References

External links

1988 births
Living people
Swedish female long-distance runners
Swedish female marathon runners
Place of birth missing (living people)
World Athletics Championships athletes for Sweden